Piloty's acid is an organic compound with the formula C6H5SO2N(H)OH. A white solid, it is the benzenesulfonyl derivative of hydroxylamine. It is one of the main reagents used to generate nitroxyl (HNO), a highly reactive species that is implicated in a some chemical and biochemical reactions.

See also
 Angeli's salt

References

Hydroxylamines
Sulfonamides
Benzenesulfonates